Mukhametdaminovo (Möxämätdämin) is a rural locality (a village) in Sterlibashevsky Selsoviet, Sterlibashevsky District, Bashkortostan, Russia. The population was 110 as of 2010. There are 3 streets.

Geography 
Mukhametdaminovo is located 6 km southwest of Sterlibashevo (the district's administrative centre) by road. Sterlibashevo is the nearest rural locality.

References 

Rural localities in Sterlibashevsky District